Louise Reichardt or Luise Reichardt (11 April 1779 – 17 November 1826) was a German composer and choral conductor. Her German songs or Lieder, written in an accessible style akin to folk music, were popular, and she was influential in the musical life of Hamburg, Germany, where she lived from 1809.

Biography

Early life
She was born in Berlin. She was the daughter of composers Juliane Reichardt (1752–1783) and Johann Friedrich Reichardt (1752–1814) and granddaughter of Franz Benda (1709–1786). Her grandfather and father were respectively Konzertmeister and Kapellmeister at the court of Frederick the Great. After Juliane Reichardt died, the family moved from Berlin to Giebichenstein near Halle. Louise Reichardt took music lessons from her father, and in 1800 four of her songs were published in a collection of his songs. The Reichardts entertained literary figures such as Goethe, Ludwig Tieck, Novalis, Clemens Brentano, and Phillip Ludwig Achim von Arnim. Later, she would use von Arnim's poetry in a collection of twelve songs.

Hamburg
In 1809 she moved to Hamburg where she studied with Johann Frederich Clasing. She taught music, instructed choruses, and composed. She did not rely on royalty or wealthy patrons to hear her music. During her time in Hamburg, from 1809 until 1826, she composed the majority of her Lieder. She reached the public by writing in an easily accessible, folksy style, combining memorable melodies with simple piano accompaniments.

Reichardt was also active as a choral conductor and established a Gesangverein choral society in Hamburg. However, due to the prevailing sexism of the times, she was never allowed to conduct them in public. "Despite these gender restrictions, Reichardt strongly influenced musical life in Hamburg through her composing, teaching, and behind-the-scenes conducting." She also translated the Latin works of Hasse and Graun into German.

Personal life
Reichardt’s husband to be, the writer , suddenly died before their wedding. Her second husband to be, the painter Franz Gareis, also died before their wedding.

Works
Selected works include:
Giusto Amor
Notturno
Vanne felice rio (Metastasio) (1806)
Bergmannslied (Novalis)
Heimweh (attributed to Wetzel)
Die Blume der Blumen (Runge)
Duettino (1802) (Brentano)  (two tenors)
From Des Knaben Wunderhorn: Hier liegt ein Spielmann begraben
Betteley der Vögel

References

External links
Luise Reichardt: Unruhiger Schlaf from YouTube

 Free digital scores by Louise Reichardt in the OpenScore Lieder Corpus

1779 births
1826 deaths
19th-century classical composers
19th-century German composers
German classical composers
German women classical composers
German music educators
Women music educators
19th-century women composers